Måns Magnus Mårlind (born 29 July 1969) is a Swedish director and screenwriter. After making his feature film debut in 2005, he co-directed the big-budget horror films Shelter (2010) and Underworld: Awakening (2012) and co-created the Danish-Swedish crime thriller The Bridge (2011–2018).

Career
His first work was as a writer for the 1995 Swedish drama series Radioskugga, followed by the children's science fiction series Kenny Starfighter (1997).

Work with Björn Stein 
In 2005, Mårlind and Björn Stein made their feature film debut with the fantasy thriller Storm, which was followed by the 2010 supernatural thriller Shelter (also known as 6 Souls in the United States), starring Julianne Moore and Jonathan Rhys Meyers and based on a screenplay by UK screenwriter Michael Cooney. Mårlind and Stein then co-directed Underworld: Awakening (2012), which starred Kate Beckinsale as Selene and grossed over $160 million worldwide, and Shed No Tears (2013), based on the songs of singer-songwriter Håkan Hellström. The latter was nominated for nine Guldbagge Awards (the Swedish equivalent of the Academy Awards), including Best Director and Best Film.

For television, the duo directed all episodes of the Swedish-French police procedural Midnight Sun (2016) and the Netflix-distributed historical thriller The Defeated (2020), also known as Shadowplay. Both series were created and written by Mårlind.

Personal life
He is the father of one child with English actress Tuppence Middleton, born in August 2022.

Filmography

Film

Television

Awards and nominations

References

External links

1969 births
Living people
Swedish film directors
Swedish screenwriters
Swedish male screenwriters
Horror film directors
20th-century Swedish people